Mercier is a suburban town in southwestern Quebec, Canada, in the Roussillon Regional County Municipality. It is located on the Châteauguay River, southwest of Montreal. The population as of the Canada 2021 Census was 14,626.

History

Officially founded in 1855, Mercier was formerly called Sainte-Philomène. The name was changed in 1968 in order to pay homage to the former Premier of Quebec, Honoré Mercier, who served from 1887 to 1891. The name change is also due to the proximity to the Honoré Mercier Bridge and also aims to give the city a name that is more marketable and less unpleasant in English.

Moreover, the worship dedicated to Philomena was increasingly uncertain and had survived thanks to the devotion with which it was surrounded in the 19th century. This last reason precipitated the decision to change the name of the city.

The first municipal council was formed in Sainte-Philomène in 1845 and sat, in accordance with the law, for two years, the first mayor of which was Antoine Couillard (1845-1846).

Demographics 

Transportation
The CIT du Haut-Saint-Laurent provides commuter and local bus services.

See also
 Roussillon Regional County Municipality
 Rivière de l'Esturgeon (Châteauguay River)
 List of cities in Quebec

References

External links

Mercier official website

Cities and towns in Quebec
Incorporated places in Roussillon Regional County Municipality
Greater Montreal
Canada geography articles needing translation from French Wikipedia